Almadasuchus is an extinct genus of crocodylomorph known from the early Middle Jurassic (early Bajocian stage) Puesto Almada Member of the Cañadón Asfalto Formation of Patagonia, Argentina. It contains a single species, Almadasuchus figarii. It is known from the holotype MPEF-PV 3838, a well-preserved posterior region of the skull as well as other skull and postcranial remains.

Description 
According to a phylogenetic analysis that accompanied the first description of the species, A. figarii is the sister taxon or closest relative of the clade Crocodyliformes, a large group that originated in the Late Triassic and includes modern crocodilians. It is also a close relative of "sphenosuchians", a paraphyletic group of more basal non-crocodyliform crocodylomorphs. Almadasuchus is most closely related to the "sphenosuchian" Junggarsuchus from the Middle Jurassic of China. Almadasuchus is one of only four non-crocodyliform crocodylomorphs known from after the Early Jurassic, the others being Junggarsuchus and two "sphenosuchians" from the Late Jurassic Morrison Formation in the western United States, Hallopus and Macelognathus. Crocodyliforms appeared in the Late Triassic and began a major evolutionary radiation in the Jurassic, making Almadasuchus one of the last non-crocodyliform crocodylomorphs.

Almadasuchus is considered a transitional form between crocodyliforms and earlier archosaurs with respect to its braincase. In nearly all diapsid reptiles the braincase is weakly connected to other bones that make up the back of the skull, making this region flexible or kinetic. In crocodyliforms, the braincase is strongly sutured to a bone called the quadrate, making the skull completely immovable or akinetic. The quadrate of Almadasuchus is not completely fused to the braincase, but makes connections with two braincase bones, the basisphenoid and the exoccipital. These two attachment points probably made the skull of Almadasuchus completely akinetic. Jungarrsuchus, which is the second most closely related non-crocodyliform crocodylomorph to crocodyliforms, has a quadrate that only attaches to the exoccipital.

Phylogeny 
Below is a cladogram modified from Pol et al. (in press).

References 

Late Jurassic crocodylomorphs of South America
Oxfordian life
Jurassic Argentina
Fossils of Argentina
Cañadón Asfalto Formation
Fossil taxa described in 2013
Prehistoric pseudosuchian genera